Imagination is the second studio album released by Bethany Dillon. It was released on August 16, 2005.

Critical reception

Timothy Yap of Hallels writes, "Imagination is the then 16 year-old's sophomore album that takes a step closer to CCM than her self-titled debut. Imagination is an optimistic, thoughtful album, full of interesting  melodies and interwoven with string arrangements and heartfelt lyrics. This album is half energetic worship service, half quiet solitary confession."

Crosswalk touches on the album during an interview with Dillon and remarks, "Based on the artistic growth evident on Imagination, it's clear Bethany's commitment to being open is paying off. Simply put, this second album is a sophomore jump."

Track listing

Track information and credits verified from the album's liner notes.

References

2005 albums
Bethany Dillon albums